A Pneumatic stabilized platform (PSP) is a technology used to float a very large floating structure (VLFS). 

PSP utilizes indirect displacement, in which a platform rests on trapped air that displaces the water. The primary buoyancy force is provided by air pressure acting on the underside of the deck. The PSP is a distinct type of pneumatic platform, one in which the platform is composed of a number of cylindrical shaped components packed together in a rectangular pattern to form a module.

Development 
The Pneumatically Stabilized Platform was originally proposed for constructing a new floating airport for San Diego in the Pacific Ocean, at least three miles off the tip of Point Loma.  However, this proposed design was rejected in October, 2003 due to high cost, the difficulty in accessing such an airport, the difficulty in transporting jet fuel, electricity, water, and gas to the structure, failure to address security concerns such as a bomb blast, inadequate room for high-speed exits and taxiways, and environmental concerns.

See also
 Floating airport

References

External links
 Float Incorporated 
  Center for Contemporary Conflict - "The Atlantis Garrison: A Comprehensive, Cost Effective Cargo and Port Security Strategy" by Dr. Michael J. Hillyard(PSP / Floating Airport technology could be used for Cost Effective Cargo & Port Security)
  September 1996 -"FLOATING AIRPORTS: Wave of the Future"
  November 18, 1999 by Michael McCabe, SF Chronicle Staff Writer "Planes would land on floating runways built on S.F. Bay"
 Centre National De La Recherche Scientifique "FLOATPORT: a floating solution to the San Diego airport's environmental problems" Auteur(s)/Author(s)BLOOD H.; INNIS D., Float Inc., San Diego CA, ETATS-UNIS
  San Diego Union Tribune - SignOnSanDiego.com "Floating airport proposal resurfaces"
 Jim Bell - Ecological Designer "Airport: Thinking Outside the Box"
  9/26/2005 USAToday.com "Today in the Sky: Will San Diego build an airport in the ocean?" by Ben Mutzabaugh
  San Diego CityBEAT, "The sinking of the San Diego floating airport proposal" by D.A. KOLODENKO

Structural system
Naval architecture